Lookrak Kiatmungmee is a Thai former professional boxer who competed from 2005 to 2014 and challenged for the WBC strawweight title in 2013.

Professional career
Kiatmungee lost to Liempetch Sor Veerapol on July 23, 2010 via knockout only three seconds into the first round.

Almost two years after losing to Omari Kimweri on December 2, 2011 by unanimous decision, Kiatmungmee challenged for his first world title on November 30, 2013 against WBC mini-flyweight champion Xiong Zhao Zhong. However, he would end up losing by fifth-round knockout.

Professional boxing record

References

External links

Living people
Mini-flyweight boxers
Light-flyweight boxers
Flyweight boxers
Lookrak Kiatmungmee
Year of birth missing (living people)